Naalaiya Theerpu is a 1992 Indian Tamil-language action film directed by S. A. Chandrasekhar and produced by his wife Shoba Chandrasekhar which marked the debut of their son Vijay as a leading actor. The film which also starred Keerthana and Easwari Rao, with Srividya, Radha Ravi and Sarath Babu in supporting, had music composed by newcomer Manimekalai, cinematography by R. P. and editing by Gautham Raju. The story revolves around Arun Mehta, a businessman who has many extra-marital affairs, molests his wife, Mahalakshmi. However, things take an unexpected turn when she gets pregnant and has a son Vijay who later avenges against the deeds of his father.

The film was released on 4 December 1992 to mostly negative reviews and became a box-office bomb, though Vijay won the Cinema Express Award for Best New Face Actor.

Plot 

Mahalakshmi is molested by her husband Arun Mehta, who has affairs with many other women. Mahalakshmi has a son Vijay, whom she raises on her own. However, things change when her son grows up.

Cast

Production 
Vijay made his debut as a leading actor with the film, aged eighteen. A fan of Rajinikanth, he told Chandrasekhar that he wanted to headline a film. Vijay enacted a scene from Annaamalai (1992), the one in which the title character (Rajinikanth) challenges Ashok (Sarath Babu). Chandrasekhar recalled, "He did it exactly the way it was in the film, especially the line mark this date in your calendar [...] That's when I realised that he had talent, a fierce passion."

Soundtrack 
The music was composed by M. M. Srilekha, under the name of Manimekalai at the age of 12. The film featured lyrics written by Pulamaipithan, P. R. C. Balu and Bharani. The latter went on to become a popular music composer.

Release and reception 
Naalaiya Theerpu was released on 4 December 1992. Ayyappa Prasad of The Indian Express wrote, "Many tongue-in-cheek remarks on the prevailing political and economic climate makes the film worth watching". However, other reviews were mostly negative. The magazine Ananda Vikatan did not publish a review for the film. Despite Chandrasekhar's confidence, Naalaiya Theerpu became a box-office bomb. Chandrasekhar recalled in 2018, "To be honest, I shouldn’t have made that film for him especially when he was just 18 [...] I thought now that my son is also becoming an actor, I could continue to practise my style of filmmaking and pass on socially relevant messages to the audience through him. Maybe the timing wasn't right". Despite the film's failure, Vijay won the Cinema Express Award for Best New Face Actor.

References

External links 
 

1990s Tamil-language films
1990s vigilante films
1992 action films
1992 films
Films directed by S. A. Chandrasekhar
Indian action films
Indian vigilante films
Films scored by M. M. Srilekha